Ann Patchett (born December 2, 1963) is an American author. She received the 2002 PEN/Faulkner Award and the Orange Prize for Fiction in the same year, for her novel Bel Canto. Patchett's other novels include The Patron Saint of Liars (1992), Taft (1994), The Magician's Assistant (1997), Run (2007), State of Wonder (2011), Commonwealth (2016), and The Dutch House (2019). The Dutch House was a finalist for the 2020 Pulitzer Prize for Fiction.

Biography
Ann Patchett was born on December 2, 1963 in Los Angeles, California to Frank Patchett (a Los Angeles police captain who arrested Charles Manson and Sirhan Sirhan) and Jeanne Ray (a nurse who later became a novelist). She is the younger of two daughters. Her mother and father divorced when she was young. Her mother remarried, and when Patchett was six years old the family moved to Nashville, Tennessee.

Patchett attended St. Bernard Academy, a private Catholic school for girls in Nashville, Tennessee run by the Sisters of Mercy. Following graduation, she attended Sarah Lawrence College.

In her early twenties Patchett married; however, the marriage lasted only about a year.

In her late twenties, Patchett won a fellowship to the Fine Arts Work Center in Provincetown, Massachusetts; during her time there, she wrote her first novel The Patron Saint of Liars, which was published in 1992.

She later attended the Iowa Writers' Workshop at the University of Iowa, where she lived with the memoirist and poet Lucy Grealy. Their time as roommates and their life-long friendship was the subject of her 2004 memoir Truth & Beauty.

In 2010, she co-founded a bookstore with Karen Hayes, Parnassus Books, in Nashville, Tennessee, which opened in November 2011. In 2016, Parnassus Books expanded, adding a bookmobile to expand the reach of the bookstore in Nashville.

Patchett currently lives in Nashville, Tennessee, with her husband, Karl VanDevender. It is Patchett’s second marriage.

Writing

Patchett's first published work was in The Paris Review, a story that appeared before she graduated from Sarah Lawrence College.

For nine years, Patchett worked at Seventeen magazine, where she wrote primarily non-fiction and the magazine published one of every five articles she wrote. She ended her relationship with the magazine after getting into a dispute with an editor and exclaiming, "I’ll never darken your door again!"

Patchett has written for numerous publications, including The New Yorker, The New York Times Magazine, The Washington Post, O, The Oprah Magazine, ELLE, GQ, Gourmet, and Vogue.
In 1992, Patchett published The Patron Saint of Liars. The novel was made into a television movie of the same title in 1998. Her second novel Taft won the Janet Heidinger Kafka Prize in fiction in 1994. Her third novel, The Magician’s Assistant, was released in 1997. In 2001, her fourth novel Bel Canto was her breakthrough, becoming a National Book Critics Circle Award finalist, and winning the PEN/Faulkner Award.

A friend of writer Lucy Grealy, Patchett has written a memoir about their relationship, Truth and Beauty: A Friendship. Patchett's novel, Run, was released in October 2007. What now?, published in April 2008, is an essay based on a commencement speech she delivered at her alma mater in 2006.

Patchett is the editor of the 2006 volume of the anthology series The Best American Short Stories. In 2011, she published State of Wonder, a novel set in the Amazon jungle, which was shortlisted for the Orange Prize. In 2016 she published her novel Commonwealth to widespread critical acclaim. Patchett called the book her "autobiographical first novel," explaining, “The wonderful thing about publishing this book at 52 is that I know that I am [already] capable of working from a place of deep imagination.”

In 2019, Patchett published her first children's book, Lambslide, and the novel The Dutch House, a finalist for the 2020 Pulitzer Prize for Fiction.

In November 2021, she published These Precious Days, an essay collection she describes as the sequel to This Is the Story of a Happy Marriage. These Precious Days received wide acclaim, with aggregator Book Marks rating it a “rave” based on 25 reviews.

Her work has been translated into more than 30 languages.

Awards and honors

For specific works
 Nashville Banner Tennessee Writer of the Year Award, 1994.
 Janet Heidinger Kafka Prize (Taft), 1994.
 National Book Critics Circle Award finalist (Bel Canto), 2001.
 PEN/Faulkner Award (Bel Canto), 2002.
 Orange Prize (Bel Canto), 2002.
 BookSense Book of the Year (Bel Canto), 2003.
 Wellcome Trust Book Prize shortlist (State of Wonder), 2011.

For corpus
 Guggenheim Fellowship, 1995 (mid-career).
 In 2012, Patchett was recognized on the Time 100 list as one of the most influential people in the world by Time magazine.
 Peggy V. Helmerich Distinguished Author Award (body of work), 2014.
 2014 Kenyon Review Award for Literary Achievement
American Academy of Arts and Letters, 2017

Published works

Novels
 
  Reprinted in the following year, see 
  
  
  
  
 
— (2019). The Dutch House. New York, NY: Harper. .

Nonfiction

References

Further reading

External links
 
 
 Interview with Ann Patchett
 
 Book Club Girl Audio Interview with Ann Patchett
 StyleBlueprint - Packing with Ann Patchett
 NPR Fresh Air interview, 2014-01-23
 
Parnassus Books website

20th-century American novelists
21st-century American novelists
American women novelists
American memoirists
Novelists from Tennessee
University of Iowa alumni
Sarah Lawrence College alumni
People from Nashville, Tennessee
1963 births
Living people
Iowa Writers' Workshop alumni
American booksellers
American women memoirists
PEN/Faulkner Award for Fiction winners
20th-century American women writers
21st-century American women writers
21st-century American non-fiction writers
Members of the American Academy of Arts and Letters